The Tumbes River ( or Río Túmbez in Peru; Río Puyango in Ecuador), is a river in South America. The river's sources are located between Ecuadorian El Oro and Loja provinces. It is the border between El Oro and Loja, and afterwards the border between Loja and the Tumbes Region in Peru. At its confluence with the Cazaderos stream, it enters the northern coastal region of Peru called the Tumbes Region, and flows into the Pacific Ocean outside the Gulf of Guayaquil. The largest city on its banks is Tumbes, Peru.

Fauna

Fish 
Andinoacara rivulatus - The Green Terror Cichlid.

References

External links
Petrified Forest of Puyango Nominated as UNESCO World Heritage Site.

Rivers of Peru
Rivers of Ecuador
Rivers of Tumbes Region
Geography of El Oro Province
Geography of Loja Province
International rivers of South America
Border rivers